The Daily Express is an English-language newspaper in Sabah, Malaysia and the sister newspaper of the Overseas Chinese Daily News (OCDN). It is the largest daily newspaper in Sabah with an average circulation of 33,790 copies daily.

History 
The newspaper was founded by Tan Sri Yeh Pao Tzu and it was first issued on 1 March 1963. It is published in English, Malay and Kadazan. It is promoted as the "Independent National Newspaper of East Malaysia".

References

External links 

Reputable Services

1963 establishments in Malaysia
Newspapers published in Malaysia
English-language newspapers published in Asia
Mass media in Kota Kinabalu
Asian news websites
Malaysian news websites